The 1972 New Hampshire gubernatorial election was held on November 7, 1972.

Incumbent Republican Governor Walter R. Peterson Jr. was defeated for renomination in the Republican primary.

Republican nominee Meldrim Thomson Jr. defeated Democratic nominee Roger J. Crowley with 41.38% of the vote.

Primary elections
Primary elections were held on September 12, 1972.

Democratic primary

Candidates
Carmen C. Chimento
Roger J. Crowley, Democratic nominee for Governor in 1970
Robert E. Raiche, State Representative

Results

Republican primary

Candidates
Elmer E. Bussey, perennial candidate
Lucien R. Doucet
James Koromilas, State Senator
Walter R. Peterson Jr., incumbent Governor
Meldrim Thomson Jr., American Independent Party candidate for Governor in 1970

Results

General election

Candidates
Robert J. Crowley, Democratic
Malcolm McLane, Independent, Mayor of Concord
Meldrim Thomson Jr., Republican

Results

References

Bibliography
 
 
 

1972
New Hampshire
Gubernatorial
November 1972 events in the United States